William B. McBurney (died 1892) was an Irish poet who used the pseudonym Carroll Malone.  He was the author of The Croppy Boy, a poem commemorating the Irish Rebellion of 1798, and “The Good Ship Castle Down”
.  He immigrated to the United States, where he continued to write poetry in Boston, Massachusetts.  He died in 1892.

References

Irish poets
1892 deaths
Year of birth missing